Steven Pinder (born 30 March 1960) is an English actor, known for his roles on the British soap operas Crossroads (1985–1987) and Brookside (1990–2003).

Early life
Pinder was born on 30 March 1960 in Whalley, Lancashire, England. He has a younger sister, Catherine, who is 11 years younger and works in agriculture. He grew up on Downham Avenue in Great Harwood. His father was the bank manager of the NatWest in Blackburn.

He got his first job working in a cemetery when he was 15. He joined Blackburn Arts Club then Manchester Youth Theatre at 17.

He attended Norden High School on Stourton Street in Rishton near Blackburn, where he took his A levels. He went to the Drama Centre London (now part of the University of the Arts London) in Clerkenwell.

Career
Pinder is known for his role in the soap opera Brookside. He played Max Farnham in the series from 1990 to its conclusion in 2003. Previously in his career, he played the part of Roy Lambert in Crossroads. He also appeared in two series of the sitcom Foxy Lady; in C.A.T.S. Eyes, and the BBC Scotland comedy series Scotch and Wry. In December 2019, he appeared in an episode of the BBC medical drama Casualty as Mark Jowilt.

Theatre
When Pinder left Brookside, he took part in several theatre roles, including Laurence in Abigail's Party and later appearing in a psychological thriller called Dead Certain.

Pinder joined the 1st U.K./Ireland tour of Wicked in the roles of both the Wizard and Doctor Dillamond on 16 September 2014. He reprised these two roles in the 2nd U.K./Ireland tour in 2017.

Personal life
Pinder is married to actress Stephanie Chambers and they have a daughter, Scarlett Rose. He also has two other children, Helen and Alex, from his first marriage.

References

External links
 
 Brookside Soapbox
 Interview with Chris High

Video clips
 Interviewed on the Big Breakfast.

News items
 Littlehampton Gazette August 2008
 His daughter and wife - ''Chester Standard July 2008
 Peter Pan at the Wyvern Theatre in Swindon in 2005
 Lancashire Evening Telegraph September 2004

1960 births
Living people
People from Great Harwood
People from Whalley, Lancashire
English male soap opera actors
Alumni of the Drama Centre London